The 4th Royal Bavarian Chevau-légers "King" (Königlich Bayerisches Chevaulegers-Regiment „König“ Nr. 4) was a light cavalry regiment of the Royal Bavarian Army. The regiment was formed in 1744 and fought in the Napoleonic Wars, the Austro-Prussian War, the Franco-Prussian War, and World War I. The regiment was disbanded in 1919.

See also
List of Imperial German cavalry regiments

References

Cavalry regiments of the Bavarian Army
Regiments of the German Army in World War I
Military units and formations established in 1744
Military units and formations disestablished in 1919
1744 establishments in the Holy Roman Empire